Kyrykyy (Kırıkıy) is a rural locality (a selo), the only inhabited locality, and the administrative center of Kyrykyysky Rural Okrug of Verkhnevilyuysky District in the Sakha Republic, Russia, located  from Verkhnevilyuysk, the administrative center of the district. Its population as of the 2010 Census was 442, This figure is given for Kyrykyysky Rural Settlement, a municipal formation of Verkhnevilyuysky Municipal District. According to Law #173-Z 353-III, Kyrykyy is the only inhabited locality on the territory of this municipal formation of whom 218 were male and 224 female, down from 481 as recorded during the 2002 Census.

Notes

Sources
Official website of the Sakha Republic. Registry of the Administrative-Territorial Divisions of the Sakha Republic. Verkhnevilyuysky District. 

Rural localities in Verkhnevilyuysky District